The following is a list of people from East York, a former municipality in Toronto, Ontario.

Athletes
 Jim Brennan, MLS player for Toronto FC
 Rob and Rich Butler, professional baseball players: outfielders
 Russell Martin, professional baseball catcher
 Glenn Smith, former NHL player for Toronto St. Patricks
 Chris Tanev NHL defenceman for Calgary Flames
 Tamara Tatham, Basketball Player for Team Canada in Rio Olympics 
 Ron Taylor, professional baseball pitcher; physician
 Whipper Billy Watson, champion wrestler

Musicians
 Jesse F. Keeler, DJ and producer as MSTRKRFT; bassist and keyboardist of Death from Above 1979
 Still Life Still, indie rock group
 Domenic Troiano, former guitarist for Ronnie Hawkins, The Guess Who and Bush

Media
 Will Arnett, actor
 John Candy, comedian and actor 
 Shirley Douglas, actress; daughter of political leader Tommy Douglas; mother of  Kiefer Sutherland
 Peter Lynch, TV director
 Raymond Massey, actor
 Joseph Motiki, actor, voice actor, and television presenter
 Colin Mochrie, actor and improvisational comedian
 Kiefer Sutherland, movie and TV actor, 24
 Nerene Virgin, journalist, actress and teacher

Others
 George Armstrong (1870–1956), politician and labour activist
 Edwin Alonzo Boyd, bank robber
 Stan Butler, Ontario Hockey League coach, North Bay Battalion
 Stephen Harper, Canadian Prime Minister (Leaside)
 Vincent Massey, Canadian Governor General 
 Robert McClure, medical missionary
 Agnes McPhail, first woman to be elected to the House of Commons of Canada
 Tom Pashby, Canadian ophthalmologist, sport safety advocate, member of the Order of Canada
 Charles Sauriol, naturalist and author

References

 
East York